Otlukbeli is a municipality (belde) and seat of Otlukbeli District of Erzincan Province in Turkey. It had a population of 2,036 in 2021. It is divided into the neighborhoods of Fatih, Mehmet Akif Ersoy and Şehitler.

See also
Battle of Otlukbeli
Battle of Otlukbeli Martyrs' Monument

References

Populated places in Erzincan Province